Potamogeton wrightii, is an aquatic plant species in the genus Potamogeton. It is found in slow-moving fresh water.

Description
The species is fully submerged.

Ecology
This species is known to be hybridized to Potamogeton lucens in Japan and China.

References

External links

Aquarzon

wrightii
Freshwater plants
Flora of China
Flora of Japan